The 2020 Rally Italia Sardegna (also known as the Rally Italia Sardegna 2020) was a motor racing event for rally cars that was scheduled to be held over four days between 4 and 7 June 2020, but had to be postponed due to the COVID-19 pandemic. The event was reset to hold between 8 and 11 October 2020 following the cancellation of 2020 Rallye Deutschland. It marked the seventeenth running of Rally Italia Sardegna and was the seventh round of the 2020 World Rally Championship, World Rally Championship-2 and World Rally Championship-3. It was also set to be the third round of the Junior World Rally Championship. The 2020 event was based in Alghero in Sardinia and consisted of sixteen special stages.

Dani Sordo and Carlos del Barrio were the defending rally winners. Their team, Hyundai Shell Mobis WRT, were the manufacturers' winners. Kalle Rovanperä and Jonne Halttunen were the defending winners in the World Rally Championship-2 category, but they would not defend their titles as they were promoted to the higher class. In the World Rally Championship-3 category, Pierre-Louis Loubet and Vincent Landais were the reigning rally winners, but they would not defend their titles neither as they were promoted to the sport's top category. Jan Solans and Mauro Barreiro were the defending winners in the Junior World Rally Championship.

Sordo and del Barrio successfully defended their titles, winning their third career victory. Their team, Hyundai Shell Mobis WRT, were the manufacturers' winners. Pontus Tidemand and Patrick Barth were the winners in the WRC-2 category. Jari Huttunen and Mikko Lukka were the winners in the WRC-3 category. Tom Kristensson and Henrik Appelskog won the junior class.

Background

Championship standings prior to the event
Elfyn Evans and Scott Martin entered the round with an eighteen-point lead over six-time world champions Sébastien Ogier and Julien Ingrassia. Reigning world champions Ott Tänak and Martin Järveoja were third, a further nine points behind. In the World Rally Championship for Manufacturers, Toyota Gazoo Racing WRT held a nine-point lead over defending manufacturers' champions Hyundai Shell Mobis WRT, following by M-Sport Ford WRT.

In the World Rally Championship-2 standings, Pontus Tidemand and Patrick Barth held a five-point lead ahead of Mads Østberg and Torstein Eriksen in the drivers' and co-drivers' standings respectively, with Adrien Fourmaux and Renaud Jamoul in third. In the manufacturer' championship, Toksport WRT led M-Sport Ford WRT by nineteen points. Hyundai Motorsport N sat in third, a slender four points behind.

In the World Rally Championship-3 standings, Marco Bulacia Wilkinson led Jari Huttunen by twelve points in the drivers' standing, with Kajetan Kajetanowicz in third. The co-drivers' standing was led by Mikko Lukka. Maciek Szczepaniak and Aaron Johnston held second and third respectively.

In the junior championship, Mārtiņš Sesks and Renars Francis led Sami Pajari and Marko Salminen by eight points. Tom Kristensson and Joakim Sjöberg were third, eleven points further back. In the Nations' championships, Latvia held a thirteen-point lead over Finland, with Estonia in third.

Entry list
The following crews entered into the rally. The event was open to crews competing in the World Rally Championship, its support categories, the World Rally Championship-2, World Rally Championship-3, and Junior World Rally Championship and privateer entries that were not registered to score points in any championship. Sixty-four entries were received, with thirteen crews entered in World Rally Cars, six Group R5 cars entered in the World Rally Championship-2 and fifteen in the World Rally Championship-3. A further eight crews were entered in the Junior World Rally Championship in Ford Fiesta R2s.

Route

Itinerary
All dates and times are CEST (UTC+2).

Report

World Rally Cars
Dani Sordo and Carlos del Barrio were the crew who set the benchmark, while a suspension issue created a back foot for Ott Tänak and Martin Järveoja. Kalle Rovanperä and Jonne Halttunen retired from the rally when they crashed out in the morning loop of the second leg. Sordo and del Barrio eventually won the rally for the second straight year. There was an epic battle for the runner-up spot between the crew of Thierry Neuville and Nicolas Gilsoul and Sebastien Ogier and Julien Ingrassia, with Neuville and Gilsoul ultimately came out on top.

Classification

Special stages

Championship standings

World Rally Championship-2
A trouble-free run assured championship leaders Pontus Tidemand and Patrik Barth to win the rally. Adrien Fourmaux and Renaud Jamoul were pushing hard to catch the lead until they suffered a mechanical issue.

Classification

Special stages

Championship standings

World Rally Championship-3
Oliver Solberg and Aaron Johnston led the class after the first leg. However, they picked up a puncture on Saturday morning, which dropped them back to third. Despite reclaiming the lead after SS11, they went off the road during the final stage of the day, handing the lead back to Jari Huttunen and Mikko Lukka. Huttunen and Lukka's lead was threatened by Kajetan Kajetanowicz and Maciej Szczepaniak until the Polish crew picked up a puncture during the second to last stage.

Classification

Special stages

Championship standings

Junior World Rally Championship
Steered out of dramas, Tom Kristensson and Joakim Sjöberg held a comfortable lead going onto Saturday. The Swedish crew stayed cool on Saturday, holding a huge gap of over eight minutes onto Sunday. Eventually, they won the rally to close the gap to championship leaders.

Classification

Special stages

Championship standings

Notes

References

External links
  
 2020 Rally Italia Sardegna at ewrc-results.com
 The official website of the World Rally Championship

Italy
2020 in Italian motorsport
Italy
October 2020 sports events in Italy
2020